The 2014–15 Dynamo Moscow season in football was the 92nd season in the club's history. They participated in the Russian Premier League, Russian Cup and the Europa League.

Squad

Out on loan

Reserve squad

Transfers

Summer

In:

Out:

Winter

In:

Out:

Competitions

Russian Premier League

Results by round

Matches

League table

Russian Cup

UEFA Europa League

Qualifying phase

Group stage

Knockout stage

Squad statistics

Appearances and goals

|-
|colspan="14"|Players away from the club on loan:

|-
|colspan="14"|Players who appeared for Dynamo Moscow no longer at the club:

|}

Goal Scorers

Disciplinary record

Notes

 MSK time changed from UTC+4 to UTC+3 permanently on 26 October 2014.

References

FC Dynamo Moscow seasons
Dynamo Moscow
Dynamo Moscow